John Cappelletti (born August 9, 1952) is an American former professional football player who was a running back in the National Football League (NFL) with the Los Angeles Rams and the San Diego Chargers.

Prior to his professional career, he attended Penn State, where he won the Heisman Trophy in 1973. He was inducted into the College Football Hall of Fame in 1993. Penn State football coach Joe Paterno said that Cappelletti was "the best football player I ever coached." Cappelletti's relationship with his younger brother Joey, who was stricken with leukemia, was chronicled into a book and television movie, Something for Joey.

Early years
Born in Upper Darby, Pennsylvania, Cappelletti attended St. Laurence School in Upper Darby, Pennsylvania prior to Monsignor Bonner High School in Drexel Hill, a suburb west of Philadelphia, played quarterback, and graduated in 1970.

College career
In the era before freshman eligibility, Cappelletti was a running back on the freshman team at Penn State in 1970. During his sophomore season in 1971, he played as a defensive back, as the Nittany Lions had two senior running backs who were taken early in the 1972 NFL Draft: Franco Harris (13th overall) and Lydell Mitchell (48th).

As a senior tailback at Penn State in 1973, Cappelletti gained 1,522 yards on 286 carries scoring 17 touchdowns as the Nittany Lions rolled to an undefeated 12–0 season. He was awarded the 1973 Heisman Trophy, Maxwell Award, the UPI College Football Player of the Year, the Walter Camp Award, the Chic Harley Award, as well as receiving All-America honors. In his two-year running-back career, Cappelletti gained over 100 yards in thirteen games and had a career total of 2,639 yards and twenty-nine touchdowns for an average of 120 yards per game and 5.1 yards per carry. His Heisman acceptance speech, where he dedicated his award to his dying brother Joey, is one of the most memorable in the history of college sports.

He was also a member of the Gamma Phi chapter of Phi Gamma Delta at Penn State.

The relationship between Cappelletti and his younger brother, who died of childhood leukemia on April 8, 1976, was made into a television movie in 1977 called Something for Joey; Cappelletti was played by Marc Singer. The movie was based on the book of the same name written by Richard E. Peck and chronicled the bond between the two brothers as Cappelletti supported his young brother, ill with cancer.

During Cappelletti's senior season, Penn State played West Virginia in late October. The morning of the game, Cappelletti asked Joey what he wanted for his upcoming 11th birthday. Joey replied "I want you to score three touchdowns for me. No, four."
In Something for Joey, a shocked Cappelletti is seen confiding to a teammate: "How am I going to score four touchdowns?"  At the end of the first half, Cappelletti had scored 3 touchdowns, well on his way to four. But head coach Joe Paterno did not like to run up the score against opponents, so when the game resumed after halftime, Paterno told Cappelletti he would be on the bench. Cappelletti quietly took his seat on the bench, without telling Paterno of Joey's wish. Late in the third quarter, one of Cappelletti's teammates told Paterno of Joey's wish. On Penn State's next possession, Paterno shouted "22" and Cappelletti took the field; he scored his fourth touchdown on the same possession, and pointed to Joey as he ran off the field. The Lions scored three more touchdowns in the fourth quarter and won 62–14.

Later honors
Cappelletti was inducted into the College Football Hall of Fame in 1993, and is also a member of the National Italian American Sports Hall of Fame.  He was inducted into the Philadelphia Sports Hall of Fame as a member of the 2009 Inductee Class.

The undefeated 1973 team was honored at Beaver Stadium during halftime of the 2013 home opener on September 7, and Cappelletti received special recognition –  his No. 22 was retired by the program, the first and only number to be retired by any sport at the university.

On December 11, 2014, the Big Ten Network included Cappelletti on "The Mount Rushmore of Penn State Football," as chosen by online fan voting. He was joined in the honor by linebackers Jack Ham, LaVar Arrington, and Shane Conlan.

Professional career
Cappelletti was the eleventh overall pick of the 1974 NFL Draft, taken by the Los Angeles Rams. He played nine seasons in the league, five with the Rams , and four with the San Diego Chargers   He missed the entire 1979 season due to a groin injury.

Personal life
Cappelletti is married with four sons and resides in Laguna Niguel, California with his wife Betty (née Berry). His sister-in-law is the daughter of Heisman Trophy winner Alan Ameche. He is not related to former Boston Patriots star and 1964 AFL MVP Gino Cappelletti.

Cappelletti also is a classic car enthusiast.

See also
 List of Pennsylvania State University people
 List of people from Pennsylvania
 List of Phi Gamma Delta members

References

External links
 
 
 
 

1952 births
Living people
American football running backs
Los Angeles Rams players
Penn State Nittany Lions football players
San Diego Chargers players
All-American college football players
College Football Hall of Fame inductees
Heisman Trophy winners
Maxwell Award winners
People from Laguna Niguel, California
Players of American football from Philadelphia